Dirty Dancing (or Dirty Dancing: Living the Dream) is an American reality television series. The series was hosted by Cris Judd and was shown on WE: Women's Entertainment. Fifteen men and fifteen women were paired for a dance competition.  Each episode featured couples learning dance routines with the weakest couples eliminated from the competition.  Cris Judd and Eddie Garcia were the choreographers.

Notes

External links
Official website

2000s American reality television series
2006 American television series debuts
2007 American television series endings